Mahmoud Sayed Abdelsalam El Sayad (born 12 April 1993) is an Egyptian male badminton player.

Achievements

BWF International Challenge/Series
Men's Doubles

Mixed Doubles

 BWF International Challenge tournament
 BWF International Series tournament
 BWF Future Series tournament

References

External links
 

Living people
1993 births
Egyptian male badminton players
Badminton players at the 2010 Summer Youth Olympics
21st-century Egyptian people